Hooker Township, Nebraska may refer to one of the following places:

 Hooker Township, Dixon County, Nebraska
 Hooker Township, Gage County, Nebraska

Nebraska township disambiguation pages